A compressed air foam system is used in firefighting to deliver fire retardant foam for the purpose of extinguishing a fire or protecting unburned areas.

Typical components include a water source, a centrifugal pump, foam concentrate tanks, a direct-injection foam proportioning system on the discharge side of the pump, a mixing chamber or device, a rotary air compressor, and control systems to ensure the correct mixes of concentrate, water, and air.

Description

A compressed air foam system is defined as a standard water pumping system that has an entry point where compressed air can be added to a foam solution to generate foam. The air compressor also provides energy, which, gallon for gallon, propels compressed air foam rather than aspirated or standard water nozzles. 

It is proven that CAFS attacks all three sides of the fire triangle simultaneously. The foam blankets the fuel, thereby reducing the fuel’s capacity to seek a source of oxygen. The CAFS solution adheres to ceilings and walls, more readily aiding in rapid reduction in heat. Also, the opaque surfaces of the foam, as it adheres to walls and ceilings, shield the fuel source from radiant energy. (Brooks, 2005; Brooks, 2006) - Later disproven in NIST Study, see below.

CAFS may also refer to any pressurized water style extinguisher that is charged with foam and pressurized with compressed air.

It has later been proven that CAFS is no more effective at extinguishing fires than regular water and may actually be detrimental to interior attacks. It also had the habit of burning firefighters during offensive interior operations due to introducing air (part of the fire tetrahedron) and generating more steam when attempting to combat initial fires.

History
The idea that water is not a perfect tool for fire extinguishment has been long noted, as by W. E. Clark (1991), "The process of extinguishing fire by water is cumbersome and generally costly … the cost of installing water mains large enough for required flow, the installation and maintenance of fire hydrants, and the acquisition and maintenance of fire department pumpers, fire hose, and nozzles, make water a fairly expensive extinguishing agent … the use of water is hardly the ideal way to extinguish fire … there must be a better method waiting to be discovered." (p. 75)

Liebson (1996) adds, "Water is an inefficient extinguishing agent. It requires the use of large quantities at costs both financial and physical. These costs are imposed on the firefighter and the community." (p. 5)

The use of foam additives to water for extinguishment dates back to an English patent in 1877 for a method to produce chemical foam (Liebson, 1991, p. xi). The Royal Navy experimented with agents foamed by means of compressed air in the 1930s (Darley, 1994) and the United States Navy was using compressed air foam systems (CAFS) in the 1940s for flammable liquid fires.

In the mid 1970s Mark Cummins, while working for the Texas Forest Service, developed a water expansion system known as the Texas Snow Job. Mr. Cummins invented the CAFS and was issued the US Patent 4318443 in 1982. The duration was limited by the use of compressed air cylinders rather than compressors (The US and foreign patent issued to Mark Cummins also included all types of air compressors and inert gas generators). By the mid-1980s, research by the United States Bureau of Land Management in co-operation with Mark Cummins, led to modern design features of rotary air compressors, centrifugal pumps, and direct-injection foam-proportioning systems (Fornell, 1991; IFSTA, 1966). CAFS received national attention in 1988 during the Yellowstone Park wildfires when the four-story Old Faithful Inn was successfully protected by blanketing it with compressed air foam (Darley, 1994).

In the spring of 1994, a compressed air foam demonstration vehicle manufactured by W.S. Darley & Co., was driven from coast to coast in North America by Troy Carothers. The purpose was to spread the word about CAFS and display this relatively new technology to United States and Canadian firefighting services. Many years earlier Darley Co. teamed up with Cummins on the WEPS (water expansion pumping system) demonstration vehicle. The 1994 Darley demo vehicle was operated by Troy Carothers who was involved with the initial design and assembly of the Darley AutoCAFS product. Carothers is now the Darley AutoCAFS Manager and oversees all aspects of CAFS development for Darley Co. This demonstration vehicle concept has continued annually since 1994.

Foam types
CAFS is able to deliver a range of useful foam consistencies, labeled from type 1 (very dry) to type 5 (wet), which are controlled by the air-to-solution ratio, and, to a lesser extent, by the concentrate-to-water percentage. Type 1 and 2 foams have long drain times, meaning the bubbles do not burst and give up their water quickly, and long duration. Wet foams, such as type 4 and 5, drain more quickly in the presence of heat. 

A major advantage of using CAFS is having the unique ability to produce a wide range of foam qualities or foam types to provide the most appropriate foam response to individual fire situations. This gives the fire officer the advantage of custom tailoring the best foam type for the tactical use and fire problem at hand..

After testing a dry type 2 foam in several situations, Johnny Murdock notes, "The emerging consensus is that the dryer foams (type II; maybe type I) should be used to suppress vapors, protect unburned structures, build wildland fire lines involving unburned fuels; … and that structural fire suppression requires a wetter foam (type IV or type V); and that both structural and wildland overhaul require type V foam."

This air to foam solution ratio produces a wet, quick draining finished foam that will quickly knockdown flame and reduce fire compartment temperature. This ratio also allows for a higher relative foam solution (liquid) flow rate to help maintain the highest levels of firefighter safety possible. (The Compressed Air Foam Systems Handbook, Colletti 2005.) 

While Colletti's claims for flows are not agreed upon by many industry experts, as exhibited at the CAFS symposium held in Rosenberg, Texas in February 2007. It was further agreed that the maximum combination of air flow mixed with foam solution flow out of a 1-3/4" line under normal pump pressures of 100–125 PSI could not physically exceed a total of 140–150. (Texas CAFS Symposium February, 2007)

Water can conversion
Air pressurized water (APW) fire extinguishers are commonly converted into makeshift CAFS extinguishers by drilling two 1/8-1/16 inch holes in the pickup tube above the water line. Typically, the tip of the smooth-bore application nozzle is then cut off to allow the foam to properly expand. Keeping the nozzle will result in wetter foam but longer range. Cutting the nozzle will result in an expanded, dry foam but will lack the range of the standard water nozzle. CAFS extinguishers can also be fitted with air aspirators, commonly used on AFFF and FFFP foam extinguishers, which will result in a more expanded foam but will lack the heat resistance of non-aspirated foam, which does not break the bubbles.

Problems
On 17 December 2005 two firefighters from Tübingen, Germany, died inside a burning building when one of the hoses inside the building burst and they were left without extinguishing agent. In the following reconstruction of the tragedy, experts were surprised to find out that CAFS filled hoses are more likely to burst under heat because the foam is unable to cool the hoses sufficiently.

Some fire district engines have experienced that CAFS-filled hoses have a higher incidence of clogging and decrease in pressure.

References

 Technical Report 98: Compressed Air Foam Systems in Limited Staffing Conditions — United States Fire Administration, Department of Homeland Security, United States Government
 Karlsruhe Institute of Technology (KIT) - Forschungsstelle für Brandschutztechnik: Research reports No. 140, No. 150  — [see also the presentation: https://www.ffb.kit.edu/download/DLS2003.pdf]
Australian Bushfire CRC - Using CAF for Grassland Fires (ACT RFS)

Fire suppression agents
Wildfire suppression equipment